The 10th parallel south is a circle of latitude that is 10 degrees south of the Earth's equatorial plane. It crosses the Atlantic Ocean, Africa, the Indian Ocean, Australasia, the Pacific Ocean and South America.

Part of the border between Brazil and Peru is defined by the parallel.

Around the world
Starting at the Prime Meridian and heading eastwards, the parallel 10° south passes through:

{| class="wikitable plainrowheaders"
! scope="col" width="125" | Co-ordinates
! scope="col" | Country, territory or sea
! scope="col" | Notes
|-
| style="background:#b0e0e6;" | 
! scope="row" style="background:#b0e0e6;" | Atlantic Ocean
| style="background:#b0e0e6;" |
|-
| 
! scope="row" | 
|
|-valign="top"
| 
! scope="row" | 
|
|-
| 
! scope="row" | 
|
|-
| 
! scope="row" | 
|
|-
| style="background:#b0e0e6;" | 
! scope="row" style="background:#b0e0e6;" | Lake Malawi
| style="background:#b0e0e6;" |
|-
| 
! scope="row" | 
|
|-valign="top"
| style="background:#b0e0e6;" | 
! scope="row" style="background:#b0e0e6;" | Indian Ocean
| style="background:#b0e0e6;" | Passing between islands in the Aldabra Group,  Passing just north of Farquhar Atoll,  Passing just north of the Agalega Islands, 
|-
| 
! scope="row" | 
| Island of Sumba
|-
| style="background:#b0e0e6;" | 
! scope="row" style="background:#b0e0e6;" | Savu Sea
| style="background:#b0e0e6;" |
|-
| 
! scope="row" | 
| Island of Timor
|-
| style="background:#b0e0e6;" | 
! scope="row" style="background:#b0e0e6;" | Timor Sea
| style="background:#b0e0e6;" |
|-
| style="background:#b0e0e6;" | 
! scope="row" style="background:#b0e0e6;" | Arafura Sea
| style="background:#b0e0e6;" |
|-
| style="background:#b0e0e6;" | 
! scope="row" style="background:#b0e0e6;" | Coral Sea
| style="background:#b0e0e6;" | Passing through the Torres Strait Islands, 
|-
| 
! scope="row" | 
| Island of New Guinea
|-
| style="background:#b0e0e6;" | 
! scope="row" style="background:#b0e0e6;" | Solomon Sea
| style="background:#b0e0e6;" |
|-
| 
! scope="row" | 
| Normanby Island
|-
| style="background:#b0e0e6;" | 
! scope="row" style="background:#b0e0e6;" | Solomon Sea
| style="background:#b0e0e6;" | Passing just south of the island of Guadalcanal, 
|-valign="top"
| style="background:#b0e0e6;" | 
! scope="row" style="background:#b0e0e6;" | Pacific Ocean
| style="background:#b0e0e6;" | Passing between the islands of South Malaita and Makira,  Passing just south of the island of Ulawa,  Passing between the Duff and Reef island groups,  Passing between the atolls of Nukulaelae and Niulakita, 
|-
| 
! scope="row" | 
| Rakahanga atoll
|-
| style="background:#b0e0e6;" | 
! scope="row" style="background:#b0e0e6;" | Pacific Ocean
| style="background:#b0e0e6;" |
|-
| 
! scope="row" | 
| Caroline Island
|-
| style="background:#b0e0e6;" | 
! scope="row" style="background:#b0e0e6;" | Pacific Ocean
| style="background:#b0e0e6;" |
|-
| 
! scope="row" | 
| Island of Tahuata
|-
| style="background:#b0e0e6;" | 
! scope="row" style="background:#b0e0e6;" | Pacific Ocean
| style="background:#b0e0e6;" |
|-
| 
! scope="row" | 
| Island of Mohotani
|-
| style="background:#b0e0e6;" | 
! scope="row" style="background:#b0e0e6;" | Pacific Ocean
| style="background:#b0e0e6;" |
|-
| 
! scope="row" | 
|
|-
| 
! scope="row" |  /  border
|
|-
| 
! scope="row" | 
|
|-
| 
! scope="row" | 
| Acre
|-
| 
! scope="row" | 
|
|-valign="top"
| 
! scope="row" | 
| Rondônia Mato Grosso Tocantins Maranhão Piauí Bahia Sergipe Alagoas
|-
| style="background:#b0e0e6;" | 
! scope="row" style="background:#b0e0e6;" | Atlantic Ocean
| style="background:#b0e0e6;" |
|}

See also
9th parallel south
11th parallel south

s10
Brazil–Peru border